The 2006 Portuguese Social Democratic Party leadership election was held on 5 May 2006. This was the first leadership election open to all party members, due to a change in the party's rules proposed by then party leader Luís Marques Mendes, elected in April 2005. Marques Mendes was the sole candidate, thus winning with more than 90% of the votes.

Candidates

Results

See also
 Social Democratic Party (Portugal)
 List of political parties in Portugal
 Elections in Portugal

References

External links
PSD Official Website

2006 in Portugal
Political party leadership elections in Portugal
2006 elections in Portugal
Portuguese Social Democratic Party leadership election